The  New York Giants season was the franchise's 73rd season in the National Football League and the first under head coach Jim Fassel, who replaced Dan Reeves after four seasons. 

The Giants improved upon their previous season's output of 6–10. They managed to record a 10-5-1 record, the Giants’ best mark since 1993, and won the NFC East for the first time since their 1990 Super Bowl season. 

Despite winning the division title and earning a home playoff game, the Giants were eliminated in their Wild Card Round matchup by the Minnesota Vikings.

Offseason

NFL Draft

Roster

Regular season

Schedule

Standings

Postseason

See also 
 List of New York Giants seasons

References 

New York Giants seasons
NFC East championship seasons
New York Giants
New York Giants season
20th century in East Rutherford, New Jersey
Meadowlands Sports Complex